Hidden Agenda is a 2001 Canadian action film written by Les Walton and directed by Marc S. Grenier. It stars Dolph Lundgren as Jason Price, who is a former government agent who now earns money helping people disappear through a program he engineered. When his childhood friend Sonny (Ted Whittall) and mobster Paul Elkert (Serge Houde) both come to Price for help, things begin to go awry. Someone has infiltrated Price's network, and his clients begin turning up dead. He is helped in his investigation by the mobster's assistant, Renee Brooks (Maxim Roy) -- but no one is who they seem to be.

Plot 
Jason Price, a former NSA agent, operates the Daedalus network, which gives clients new identities and makes them disappear. As he lavishes a key witness against a lot of money and is hounded by a hitman (called the Cleaner), he not only sucks the FBI's anger, but also the crime syndicate Icarus, who also turns the cleaner on his best friend, the FBI agent Sonny begin. When Price also lets him submerge and shortly thereafter finds out Sonny's corpse, he realizes that the network has been infiltrated. Price follows the bloody trail of the Cleaner, which leads him not only to the true identity of the Cleaner, but also to its backers.

Cast

Dolph Lundgren as Agent Jason Price
Maxim Roy as Renee Brooks
Brigitte Paquette as Connie Glenn
Ted Whittall as Agent Sonny Mathis
Serge Houde as Paul Elkert
Alan Fawcett as Sam Turgenson
Francis X. McCarthy as Deputy Director Powell
Harry Standjofski as Kevin
Christian Paul as Charlie Radisson
Andreas Apergis as Boris Yoesky
Jeff Hall as Vincent Moretti
Cas Anvar as Agent McCoomb
Lynne Adams as Prosecutor
Alan Legros as Jerry
Jay Levalley as Paolo Bucci

References

External links
 
 

2001 films
English-language Canadian films
2001 action thriller films
Techno-thriller films
Canadian action thriller films
2000s English-language films
2000s Canadian films